Ignacio Jaúregui (born 2 August 1995) is an Argentine footballer who plays as an attacking midfielder for Austrian Second League club FC Dornbirn.

Club career
Jaúregui made his professional debut for then-Primera B Nacional team Gimnasia y Esgrima in 2013, he was subbed on for Maximiliano Meza in a 3–0 home victory over Sarmiento on 15 June in a season which ended with promotion. Another appearance followed in September 2014 against Defensa y Justicia, prior to Jaúregui departing Gimnasia y Esgrima on loan to sign for Estudiantes in Primera B Nacional. He remained with Estudiantes for two seasons and made a total of twelve appearances. On 24 August 2017, Jaúregui joined Torneo Federal A side Ferro Carril Oeste. His debut arrived on 30 September away to Sansinena.

Austrian Football Second League club WSG Wattens signed Jaúregui in June 2018. He scored on his league debut, netting the third of a 6–1 home win versus SV Lafnitz on 28 July; having notched a goal a week previous in the Austrian Cup against USK Anif. In January 2019, after four goals in fifteen appearances, Jaúregui signed a contract extension with the club until 2021. They won promotion as champions to the Bundesliga at the end of 2018–19. He didn't make an appearance across the following eighteen months due to injuries.

On 6 June 2021, he joined Linense in Spain on a three-year contract.

Jaúregui joined Austrian Second League club FC Dornbirn on 9 June 2022.

International career
In June 2014, Jaúregui was selected to train with the Argentina national football team ahead of the 2014 FIFA World Cup in Brazil. He also played for the Argentina U20s.

Career statistics
.

Honours
WSG Wattens
Second League: 2018–19

References

External links

1995 births
Living people
People from Mercedes, Buenos Aires
Argentine footballers
Argentina youth international footballers
Argentina under-20 international footballers
Association football midfielders
Club de Gimnasia y Esgrima La Plata footballers
Club Sportivo Estudiantes players
WSG Tirol players
Real Balompédica Linense footballers
Atlético Saguntino players
FC Dornbirn 1913 players
Primera Nacional players
Argentine Primera División players
Torneo Federal A players
2. Liga (Austria) players
Primera Federación players
Tercera Federación players
Argentine expatriate footballers
Expatriate footballers in Austria
Argentine expatriate sportspeople in Austria
Expatriate footballers in Spain
Argentine expatriate sportspeople in Spain
Sportspeople from Buenos Aires Province